Timepiece is the twenty-sixth studio album of 1930s and 1940s jazz standards by Country music superstar Kenny Rogers, released on 143/Atlantic Records. It was produced by David Foster. The album did not chart.

Track listing

Personnel

Musicians 
Rhythm, Vocals, Solos and Arrangements
 Kenny Rogers – vocals
 Mike Melvoin – acoustic piano 
 Terry Trotter – acoustic piano
 Randy Waldman – acoustic piano, synthesizers, synth harmonica (3), arrangements (7)
 Claude Gaudette – synthesizers, drum programming 
 David Foster – arrangements (7), keyboards (12)
 John Chiodini – guitar 
 John Pisano – guitar 
 John Guerin – drums
 Jeff Hamilton – drums
 Larry Bunker – percussion
 Don Williams – percussion
 Pete Christlieb – tenor saxophone solo (2, 5, 10)
 Earle Dumler – oboe solo (9)
 Amy Shulman – harp solo (11)
 Johnny Mandel – arrangements (1, 2, 5, 8, 10)
 Edward Karam – conductor (1, 2, 5, 8, 10)
 Jeremy Lubbock – arrangements and conductor (3, 4, 6, 9, 11)
 William Ross – string orchestrations and  conductor (12)
 Take 6 – backing vocals (7)
 Cedric Dent – vocal arrangements (7)
 Mark Kibble – vocal arrangements (7)

Orchestra Credits
 Suzie Katayama – music supervisor
 Joann Kane Music Service – music preparation 
 Jules Chaplin, Debbie Datz-Pyle and Patti Zimmitti – orchestra contractors

Brass, Horns and Woodwinds
 David Duke, Marni Johnson, Joe Meyer, Diane Muller, Rick Todd and Brad Warnaar – French horn
 Randy Aldcroft, George Bohanon, Dick Hyde and Dick Nash – trombone
 Rick Baptist, Oscar Brashear, Ron King, Frank Szabo – trumpet
 Jon Clarke, Pete Christlieb, Louise DiTullio, Earle Dumler, Dominic Fera, Gary Foster, Susan Greenberg, Dan Higgins, Jack Nimitz, Joel Peskin, Marshal Royal, Sheridon Stokes, Bob Tricarico, Jim Walker and Rickey Woodard – woodwinds

Strings
 Chuck Domanico, Don Ferrone, Richard Feves, Chris Kollgaard, Frances Lui, Ed Meares, Buell Neidlinger, John Patitucci and Margaret Storer – bass
 Vage Ayrikyan, Jodi Burnett, Larry Corbett, Ernie Ehrhardt, Steve Erdody, Christine Ermacoff, Marie Fera, Rowena Hamil, Todd Hemmenway, Paula Hochhalter, Ann Karam, Suzie Katayama, Ray Kelley, Armen Ksajikian, Dane Little, David Low, Miguel Martinez, Steve Richards, Dan Rothmuller, Fred Seykora, David Shamban, Dan Smith and Christina Soule – cello
 Gayle Levant and Amy Shulman – harp
 Marilyn Baker, Bob Becker, Sam Boghossian, Dimitri Bovaird, Ken Burward-Hoy, Rollice Dale, Brian Dembow, Pamela Goldsmith, Steve Gordon, Carrie Holzman-Little, Roland Kato, Margot Maclaine, Dan Neufeld, Mike Nowak, Andrew Picken, Kazi Pitelka, Karie Prescott, Jimbo Ross, Jody Rubin, John Scanlon, Harry Shirinian, David Stenske, Evan Wilson, Hershel Wise and Mihail Zinovyev – viola
 Richard Altenbach, Israel Baker, Arnold Belnick, Dixie Blackstone, Russ Cantor, Ron Clark, Isabelle Daskoff, Joel Derouin, Assa Drori, Bruce Dukov, Henry Ferber, Mike Ferril, Juliann French, Julie Gigante, Joe Goodman, Alan Grunfeld, Diana Halprin, Clayton Haslop, Pat Johnson, Karen Jones, Leslie Katz, Miran Kojian, Razdan Kuyumjian, Brian Leonard, Gordon Marron, Yoko Matsuda, Jayme Miller, Horia Moroaica, Irma Neuman, Robin Olson, Don Palmer, Barbra Porter, Stan Plummer, Rafael Rishik, Gil Romero, Jay Rosen, Bob and Sheldon Sanov, Marc Sazar, Haim Shtrum, Spiro Stamos, Bob Sushel, Polly Sweeney, Mari Tsumura, Jerry Vinci, Dorothy Wade, Miwako Watanabe, Elizabeth Wilson, Margaret Wooten and Shari Zippert – violin

Production 
 David Foster – producer
 Johnny Mandel – co-producer (1, 2, 5, 8, 10)
 Jeremy Lubbock – co-producer (3, 4, 6, 9, 11)
 Al Smith – audio engineer
 Dave Reitzas – vocal engineer
 Felipe Elgueta – additional engineer, assistant engineer 
 Dave Brock – assistant engineer
 Jeff DeMorris – assistant engineer 
 Noel Hazen – assistant engineer 
 Michael Reiter – assistant engineer 
 Rail Rogut – assistant engineer, mix assistant (12)
 Michael Steinbrech – assistant engineer 
 Al Schmitt – mixing (1-11)
 Humberto Gatica – mixing (12)
 John Hendrickson – mix assistant (1-11)
 Doug Sax – mastering 
 Jaymes Foster-Levy – album coordinator, cover photo handpainting

Additional Studios
 Mixed at Bill Schnee Studios (North Hollywood, CA), Ocean Way Recording (Hollywood, CA) and Record One (Los Angeles, CA).
 Mastered at The Mastering Lab (Hollywood, CA).

References

External links

1994 albums
143 Records albums
Atlantic Records albums
Kenny Rogers albums
albums arranged by Johnny Mandel
Albums produced by David Foster